Badmash Darpan (Bhojpuri: 𑂥𑂠𑂧𑂰𑂬 𑂠𑂩𑂹𑂣𑂝) is a Bhojpuri book written by Teg Ali Teg, which is a collection of Bhojpuri Ghazals. The works are centered about the customs and traditions of Benaras.

It is one of the oldest book published and Bhojpuri and first collection of Ghazals in Bhojpuri. The book was published in 1885 from Bharat Jiwan Press as was a collection of 23 Ghazals.

References

Indian poetry collections
Indian literature
Bhojpuri-language culture